Akshata Shete is a national level champion in rhythmic gymnastics from India. She participated in World Rhythmic Gymnastics Championships 2009 held at Ise Mie, Japan from 7–13 September 2009 and scored the highest amongst the Indian Team at FIG World Cup Event held at Belarus, Minsk from 21 – 23 May 2010. Later on she captained Indian team and scored the highest in the team at the World Rhythmic Gymnastics Championship, held at Moscow, Russia from 20–26 September 2010. She represented India at the Commonwealth Games 2010,Delhi. She has won in total 47 Golds, 40 Silvers and 30 Bronze medals (State and National Level) and retired in 2012. She made a Guinness World Record for most hula hoop rotations with the leg in the arabesque position in one minute, the record was made on 21 March 2011 on the set of Guinness World Records - Ab India Todega in Mumbai. She was awarded the "Shiv Chhatrapati Krida Puraskar" in March 2011 by the Government of Maharashtra and is the Director for Rhythmic gymnastics at RG BPCA Rhythmic Club in Mumbai since 2014. She has judged Several National and International level competition as a judge for gymnastics on several occasions.

Education 
She earned her bachelor's degree in commerce (B.Com.) from R.A. Podar College. Later she earned her MBA (post graduation) from Amity Global Business School during 2012–2013 and later on went to do her Post Graduation Diploma in Sport Management from International Institute of Sports Management, Mumbai.

Coaching 
Akshata has completed her Level 1 and Level 2 FIG Academy Rhythmic Course in Uzbekistan 2017 and 2018 respectively. She was the Indian Team coach for Rhythmic Gymnastics Asian Championships 2016 held at Tashkent, Uzbekistan from 8–10 May 2016. She was appointed as a member of technical committees of Asian Gymnastics Union for a four-year term from 2019 to 2022.

International participation as Judge

14th Cycle International Level Rhythmic Gymnastics judge (category 2 individual and category 4 group) course held in Baku, Azerbaijan from 15–30 January 2017
India judge at 9th Senior and 15th Junior Rhythmic Gymnastics Asian Championships held at Astana, Kazakhstan from 24 to 27 June 2017
Judge at Gracia Cup Fig Competition from 26 to 28 September 2018 in Budapest, Hungary
FIG judge at 10th Singapore National Gymnastics Championship from 15 to 17 March 2018 in Singapore.
Rhythmic Gymnastics Technical Official in the Commonwealth Games from 4–15 April 2018 in Gold Coast, Australia
16th Junior and 10th Senior Asian Rhythmic Gymnastics Championship 2018 held in Malaysia from 29 April- 2 May 2018.
D-judge at the 15th Singapore Open Gymnastics Championships from 8–11 June 2018 held in Singapore.
D1 and E-judge at the Rhythmic Gymnastis World Challenge Cup BSB BANK, Minsk 2018.
D4 Judge at the Asian Games 2018 in Jakarta Palembang from 27–29 August 2018.
E judge at the 36th Rhythmic Gymnastics World Championships held in Sofia, Bulgaria from 10 – 16 September 2018
2nd Khelo India Youth Games held in Pune from 6-13 Jan 2019 for the Rhythmic Gymnastics Event.
Invited by the Singapore Gymnastics Federation as FIG Judge for the 11th Singapore Gymnastics National Championship from 22–23 March 2019 in Singapore.

References

External links
 

Indian rhythmic gymnasts
Living people
1991 births
Sportspeople from Mumbai